The 2022 Rochester New York FC season is the club's 23rd overall and first in MLS Next Pro. It is the first year since 2017 the club has played, and their first season under the Rochester New York FC name, after spending the first 22 seasons branded as the Rochester Rhinos. The club are the only independent team playing in MLS Next Pro, and are one of the two teams from the league to participate in the 2022 U.S. Open Cup, alongside St. Louis City SC 2. 

In the final game of the regular season, Rochester New York FC confirmed their qualification for the 2022 MLS Next Pro Playoffs after a 2-2 draw with New York City FC II at home, despite losing in the penalty shootout. They were knocked out in the Eastern Conference Semifinals by regular season champions Columbus Crew 2.

Competitive

MLS Next Pro

Standings 
Eastern Conference

Overall table

Results summary

Results

MLS Next Pro Playoffs

U.S. Open Cup 

Rochester New York is one of only two MLS Next Pro clubs eligible for the US Open Cup, being an independent team.

Squad statistics

Starting appearances are listed first, followed by substitute appearances after the + symbol where applicable.

|-
! colspan=12 style=background:#dcdcdc; text-align:center|Goalkeepers

|-
! colspan=12 style=background:#dcdcdc; text-align:center|Defenders

|-
! colspan=12 style=background:#dcdcdc; text-align:center|Midfielders

|-
! colspan=12 style=background:#dcdcdc; text-align:center|Forwards

|}

References

Rochester New York
Rochester New York
Rochester New York
Rochester New York FC seasons